Kanjana Sungngoen (born 21 September 1986) is a Thai international footballer currently playing as a forward.

Career
Sungngoen scored Thailand's only goal at the 2019 Women's World Cup, in a 5–1 loss to Sweden.

Clubs

International goals

Honours

International
Thailand 
 AFC Women's Championship 
 Fourth Place: 2018
 Fifth Place: 2014
 AFF Women's Championship: Champions: 2011, 2015, 2016, 2018
Runner-up: 2019
 Southeast Asian Games: Gold Medal: 2013
 Silver Medal: 2009, 2017, 2019

References

External links

 
 
Profile at Football.com
VN miss out on World Cup spot Vietnamnet

1986 births
Living people
Kanjana Sungngoen
2015 FIFA Women's World Cup players
Kanjana Sungngoen
Expatriate women's footballers in Japan
Nadeshiko League players
Speranza Osaka-Takatsuki players
Thai expatriate footballers
Thai expatriate sportspeople in Japan
Footballers at the 2010 Asian Games
Footballers at the 2014 Asian Games
Kanjana Sungngoen
Kanjana Sungngoen
Kanjana Sungngoen
Southeast Asian Games medalists in football
Women's association football forwards
Women's association football wingers
Footballers at the 2018 Asian Games
Competitors at the 2009 Southeast Asian Games
Competitors at the 2013 Southeast Asian Games
Competitors at the 2017 Southeast Asian Games
2019 FIFA Women's World Cup players
Kanjana Sungngoen
Competitors at the 2019 Southeast Asian Games
Kanjana Sungngoen